Palaeospinax is an extinct genus of shark which lived from the Early Triassic to the end of the Eocene epoch. Although several species have been described, the genus is considered nomen dubium because the type-specimen of the type species, Palaeospinax priscus, lacks appropriate diagnostic characters to define the genus.

Other species originally described as Synechodus were transferred to the genus Palidiplospinax.

References

Further reading 

Palaeospinacidae
Prehistoric shark genera
Triassic sharks
Jurassic sharks
Cretaceous sharks
Paleocene sharks
Eocene sharks
Prehistoric fish of Europe
Nomina dubia